Lavezzi may refer to:
 
 The Lavezzi Islands, a small archipelago of granite islands and reefs in the Mediterranean Sea
 Ezequiel Lavezzi, an Argentine footballer
 Mario Lavezzi, an  Italian singer-songwriter and composer